Baithakata College is an intermediate college in Nazirpur Upazila of Pirojpur District, Barisal Division, Bangladesh. It is located in a remote area, near the village of Baithakata. It was founded in 1999 by the industrialist Mahabubur Rahaman, under the Board of Intermediate and Secondary Education, Jessore.

See also
 Mugarjhor High School

References

External links
 

1999 establishments in Bangladesh
Educational institutions established in 1999
Buildings and structures in Barisal Division
Universities and colleges in Pirojpur District